George Edward Langford (September 15, 1859 – September 28, 1941) was an Ontario farmer and political figure. He represented Muskoka in the Legislative Assembly of Ontario from 1894 to 1898 as a Conservative-Protestant Protective Association member.

He was born in London, Canada West, the son of Isaac Langford, an Irish immigrant, and was educated in Middlesex County. He served three years as reeve for the township council for Bracebridge.

External links 
The Canadian parliamentary companion, 1897 JA Gemmill

1859 births
1941 deaths
Politicians from London, Ontario
Progressive Conservative Party of Ontario MPPs
Protestant Protective Association MPPs